Coleophora uxorella is a moth of the family Coleophoridae.

The larvae feed on the generative organs of Caragana species.

References

uxorella
Moths described in 1993